Pseudoepitheliomatous keratotic and micaceous balanitis is a cutaneous condition characterized by skin lesions on the glans penis that are wart-like with scaling.

It can present as a cutaneous horn.

See also 
 Balanitis
 Balanitis plasmacellularis
 Skin lesion

References 

Epidermal nevi, neoplasms, and cysts